John Poltimore (fl. 1390) was an English politician.

He was a Member (MP) of the Parliament of England for Totnes in January 1390.

References

Year of birth missing
Year of death missing
English MPs January 1390
Members of the Parliament of England (pre-1707) for Totnes